The Bang Lang Dam, also known as the Pattani Dam, is a multi-purpose hydroelectric dam in the Bannang Sata District of Yala Province, Thailand. It was the first multi-purpose dam developed in Thailand's southern region. The dam impounds the Pattani River, creating the Bang Lang Reservoir. The dam and its accompanying power plant were developed as part of the Pattani Project.

Description
Bang Lang Dam is an earth core rockfill dam.

The dam is considered multi-purpose supporting electricity generation, irrigation, flood control, fisheries and recreation activities.

Power plant
The dam's power plant has three hydroelectric Francis turbine-generating units, each with an installed capacity of 24 MW. A nearby mini hydroelectric project at Ban Santi has a 1.275 MW generating unit and is also part of the Pattani Project. The combined annual power generation is 200 GWh.

References

Dams in Thailand
Rock-filled dams
Hydroelectric power stations in Thailand
Buildings and structures in Yala province
Dams completed in 1981
1981 establishments in Thailand
Energy infrastructure completed in 1981